Jaguar was a three-stage sounding rocket developed by the United States Air Force in the early 1960s. Designed for air launch to allow soundings from remote areas without infrastructure, it was only launched twice before the project was abandoned.

Design and development
Jaguar was an air-launched sounding rocket developed by the Air Research and Development Command of the U.S. Air Force, intended for use for high-altitude scientific research into the aurora borealis and radiation trapped in the Van Allen Belts. Derived from a design used by the Lewis Flight Propulsion Laboratory, it was a three-stage vehicle, with a first stage of three clustered Recruit rockets, a single Recruit as a second stage, and a third stage with a Baby Sergeant rocket. It was to be launched using a Martin B-57 Canberra medium bomber that was modified to carry the rocket on a side-mounted pylon; this allowed for the rocket to be launched from any location capable of operating a jet aircraft, without the need for installing launch infrastructure in remote areas. An upgraded version using the improved "Yardbird" model of the Recruit was proposed.

Operational history
Following six dummy launch tests starting in January 1958, Jaguar was launched twice; taking place at the White Sands Missile Range under the command of the Air Force Special Weapons Center, the first launch was conducted in late 1960, and the second in early 1961. Following the two launches, the program was abandoned.

See also
NOTS-EV-1 Pilot
NOTS-EV-2 Caleb
Sparoair

References

Citations

Bibliography

Sounding rockets of the United States
Abandoned military rocket and missile projects of the United States
Equipment of the United States Air Force